was a railway station in Asahikawa, Hokkaidō Prefecture, Japan. Its station number is A33.

Lines
Hokkaido Railway Company
Sekihoku Main Line

Adjacent stations

Railway stations in Hokkaido Prefecture
Railway stations in Japan opened in 1960
Railway stations closed in 2021